Mepral is a small Indian village, in Peringara panchayath, Pulikeezhu Block, Thiruvalla taluk, Pathanamthitta district, Kerala.It Is Part Of Thiruvalla Sub-District & Comes Under Thiruvalla Constituency. Its just filled with huge water logged paddy fields.

Religious places
 St. John's SyrianOrthodox  church (Mepral Valiya Pally)
St.Thomas Evangelical Church Of India
 St. Eliyas Kalikav Orthodox Church (Kochupally)
Emmanuel Marthoma Church

References

Geography of Alappuzha district